Hachirud (also Romanized as Hachīrūd; also known as Hachrūd, Hecherūd, Hechrūd, Hīch Rūd, and Hijrood) is a city in Kelarestaq-e Gharbi Rural District, in the Central District of Chalus County, Mazandaran Province, Iran. At the 2006 census, its population was 1,750, in 476 families.

References 

Populated places in Chalus County
Cities in Mazandaran Province